Szebasztián Szabó (born 11 March 1996) is a Hungarian swimmer. He is a world record holder in the short course 50 metre butterfly. He competed in the men's 50 metre butterfly event at the 2017 World Aquatics Championships representing Serbia. In 2019, Szabó was member of the 2019 International Swimming League representing Team Iron. The same year he chose represent Hungary in the future, which was granted by FINA.

Career

2021 European Short Course Championships

In the final of the 50 metre butterfly at the 2021 European Short Course Swimming Championships, held at the Palace of Water Sports in Kazan, Russia, Szabó achieved a world record, European record, Championships record, and a Hungarian record with a time of 21.75 seconds that tied the world record set by Nicholas Santos of Brazil in 2018 and earned Szabó the gold medal in the event. Earlier in the Championships, Szabó won his first medal, a gold medal, in the 100 metre butterfly with a time of 49.68 seconds. He also won the gold medal with a time of 20.72 seconds in the 50 metre freestyle, which marked the first time in the history of the European Short Course Swimming Championships that a Hungarian swimmer had won the gold medal in the event. Szabó tying the 50 metre butterfly world record and Ilya Shymanovich of Belarus tying the 50 metre breaststroke world record earned the number one spot from Swimming World for their "The Week That Was" honor for the week of 8 November 2021.

2021 World Short Course Championships
For the 2021 World Short Course Championships in Abu Dhabi, United Arab Emirates, Szabó entered to compete in four individual events, the 50 metre freestyle, 100 metre freestyle, 50 metre butterfly, and 100 metre butterfly. In his first individual event, the 100 metre butterfly, Szabó ranked 25th in the prelims heats on day two and did not qualify for the semifinals with his time of 51.25 seconds. On day three of competition, Szabó ranked 13th in the prelims heats of the 50 metre freestyle with a time of 21.46 seconds and qualified for the semifinals later the same day. For the semifinals Szabó ranked sixth with a time of 21.06 seconds, qualifying for the final the following day. In the prelims heats of the 50 metre butterfly on day four, Szabó qualified for the semifinals ranking third with a 22.42. Szabó ranked first in the semifinals in the evening, swimming a 22.11 and qualifying for the final. Later in the same session, Szabó placed seventh in the final of the 50 metre freestyle with a time of 21.26 seconds. Szabó decided not to swim in the prelims heats of the 100 metre freestyle on day five. Later in the day he placed fourth in the final of the 50 metre butterfly with a time of 22.14 seconds.

2022
In October 2022, Szabó was announced as the only male swimmer on the Team Hungary roster for the 2022 World Short Course Championships, to be held in December in Melbourne, Australia. The following month, during the first two days of competition at the 2022 Hungarian National Short Course Championships in Kaposvár, he won the national title in the 50 metre freestyle with a time of 21.01, the silver medal in the 100 metre freestyle, where he finished in a time of 47.07 seconds and only behind first-place finisher Kristóf Milák, and the gold medal in the 50 metre backstroke. Day three, he won the gold medal in the 50 metre butterfly with a time of 22.05 seconds. On the fourth and final day, he placed second in the final of the 100 metre butterfly with a time of 50.21 seconds.

World records

Short course metres (25 m pool)

Awards and honours
 Swimming World, The Week That Was: 8 November 2021 (#1)

See also
 List of European Aquatics Championships medalists in swimming (men)
 List of European Short Course Swimming Championships medalists (men)

References

External links
 

1996 births
Living people
World record setters in swimming
World record holders in swimming
Serbian male swimmers
Hungarian male swimmers
Hungarian male freestyle swimmers
Place of birth missing (living people)
Male butterfly swimmers
European Aquatics Championships medalists in swimming
Swimmers at the 2020 Summer Olympics
Olympic swimmers of Hungary
20th-century Hungarian people
21st-century Hungarian people
Competitors at the 2022 World Games
World Games gold medalists
Medalists at the FINA World Swimming Championships (25 m)